Miloš Volešák (born 20 April 1984) is a Slovak football goalkeeper. He spent most of his career in AS Trenčín and MŠK Žilina, his last club, where he retired from professional football in winter of 2020/21 and transitioned into a goalkeeping coach.

Volešák was called up to Slovak national team as member of the broader squad in 2017, but had failed to make a debut.

Honours

Slovakia
MSK Žilina
Fortuna Liga: Winners: 2016-17

Career statistics

External links
AS Trenčín profile

References

1984 births
Living people
Sportspeople from Trenčín
Slovak footballers
Slovakia youth international footballers
Slovakia under-21 international footballers
Association football goalkeepers
AS Trenčín players
AFC Nové Mesto nad Váhom players
MŠK Žilina players
Slovak Super Liga players
3. Liga (Slovakia) players